Jarrod Pieter Bleijie (born 25 January 1982) is an Australian politician in the Queensland parliament. Bleijie was elected as the member for Kawana at the 2009 state election, and is the third member since the seat's inception at the 2001 state election. He served as Attorney-General of Queensland from 2012 until 2015.

Biography

Early life
Jarrod Bleijie was born on 25 January 1982 in Griffith, New South Wales. His father is Pieter Bleijie and his mother, Christine (Cooper) Bleijie. They moved to Caloundra, Queensland, in 1989. He attended Griffith Primary School, Caloundra State School, and Caloundra State High School, where he graduated in 2000 as school captain. He studied politics at the University of the Sunshine Coast before transferring to Brisbane to complete a Bachelor of Laws at Queensland University of Technology. He graduated in 2005.

Career as a lawyer
While studying law, Bleijie was employed as an articled clerk initially at the Maroochydore law firm of JJ Riba & Company and then at the Sunshine Coast, Queensland law firm Sajen Legal. Following his graduation, he was employed as a solicitor at Sajen Legal. During his legal career, Bleijie specialised in commercial law and management rights.

Parliamentary career
He was elected to the Parliament of Queensland in 2009, representing the Sunshine Coast electorate of Kawana.

He was promoted to the shadow ministry as Shadow Attorney-General and Shadow Minister for Justice and Corrective Services, by then Opposition Leader John-Paul Langbroek in November 2010. Following a leadership change in March 2011, with former Lord Mayor of Brisbane Campbell Newman taking over the leadership of the Liberal National Party of Queensland (LNP) from outside the parliament, he was reappointed Shadow Attorney-General, maintaining his Justice responsibilities. He re-contested and won the state seat of Kawana with a two-party preferred swing of 19.9 points, holding the seat by a 26.8-point margin. He now has one of the safest seats in the Queensland Parliament.

Attorney-General and Minister for Justice (2012–2015)
Following a landslide victory for the Newman-led Liberal National Party, in which Labor secured only 7 of 89 seats, in March 2012 newly elected premier Campbell Newman appointed Bleijie to cabinet as Attorney-General and Minister for Justice.

As Attorney-General, Bleijie introduced an amendment that renamed Queensland civil partnerships for same-sex couples into registered relationships and disallowed state-sanctioned ceremonies. Bleijie subsequently unveiled legislation to ban single people and same-sex couples from having a child through surrogacy. In 2015, Bleijie declared his support for same-sex marriage.

Opposition (2015–present)
After the defeat of the Newman government Bleijie has maintained a position on the opposition front bench under Springborg, Nicholls, Frecklington, and Crisafulli.

Criticism

Communications with Court of Appeal President McMurdo
In early 2014, Bleijie released details of a conversation he had with Court of Appeal President Margaret McMurdo concerning the appointment of judges. The week previously, McMurdo had criticised the Queensland government for appointing only one woman in the 17 judicial appointments over the last two years. Bleijie's comments to the media suggested McMurdo had sought a higher judicial appointment for her husband, Supreme Court Judge Philip McMurdo. In an interview with the ABC, Walter Sofronoff QC called for Bleijie's resignation, saying that Bleijie had betrayed McMurdo's confidence and was "unethical". Sofronoff also commented that Bleijie's comments had "the hint of a nasty schoolboy's snicker in it".

Hannay v Newman and Bleijie
On 1 April 2014, Gold Coast lawyer Chris Hannay instituted proceedings against Bleijie and the Queensland Premier Campbell Newman for defamation. On 6 February 2014, Newman had commented to journalists that lawyers who represent bikies "are hired guns. They take money from people who sell drugs to our teenagers and young people. Yes, everybody's got the right to be defended under the law, but you've got to see it for what it is: they are part of the machine, part of the criminal gang machine, and they will say and do anything to defend their clients, and try to get them off—and indeed progress their dishonest case. They are paid by criminal gangs". Bleijie later remarked that Newman was "referring to Hannay Lawyers, based on the Gold Coast" and that he too was "quite disturbed by their advice and fear campaign". He also noted that he agreed with Newman's comments. The case was settled out-of-court in 2016.

Personal life
He married Sally Lennox on 20 December 2002. They have two daughters and a son.

References

External links 

1982 births
Living people
Australian solicitors
Attorneys-General of Queensland
Liberal National Party of Queensland politicians
Members of the Queensland Legislative Assembly
Queensland University of Technology alumni
People from Griffith, New South Wales
21st-century Australian politicians
Deputy opposition leaders